German submarine U-4712 was a Type XXIII U-boat of Nazi Germany's Kriegsmarine during World War II. She was ordered on 7 July 1944, and was laid down on 3 January 1945 at Friedrich Krupp Germaniawerft AG, Kiel, as yard number 954. She was launched on 1 March 1945 and commissioned under the command of Oberleutnant zur See Karl-Heinz Rohlfing on 3 April 1945.

Design
Like all Type XXIII U-boats, U-4712 had a displacement of  when at the surface and  while submerged. The submarine was powered by one MWM six-cylinder RS134S diesel engine providing , one AEG GU4463-8 double-acting electric motor electric motor providing , and one BBC silent running CCR188 electric motor providing .

U-4712 was fitted with two  torpedo tubes in the bow. She could carry two preloaded torpedoes. The complement was 14–18 men. This class of U-boat did not carry a deck gun.

Service history
On 3 May 1945, U-4712 was scuttled at Germaniawerft, Kiel, as part of Operation Regenbogen. The wreck was later raised and broken up.

See also
 Battle of the Atlantic

References

Bibliography

External links

U-boats commissioned in 1945
World War II submarines of Germany
1945 ships
Type XXIII submarines
Ships built in Kiel
Operation Regenbogen (U-boat)
Maritime incidents in May 1945